F. maculata may refer to:

 Fabraea maculata, a plant pathogen
 Favartia maculata, a rock snail
 Fodinoidea maculata, a Malagasy moth